Augustine Atasie(born 18 August 1957) is featherweight freestyle wrestler from Nigeria who won a bronze medal at the 1982 Commonwealth Games. He competed at the 1980 Summer Olympics but was eliminated after two bouts.

References

External links
 

1957 births
Living people
Olympic wrestlers of Nigeria
Wrestlers at the 1980 Summer Olympics
Nigerian male sport wrestlers
Commonwealth Games bronze medallists for Nigeria
Nigerian sportsmen
Wrestlers at the 1982 Commonwealth Games
Commonwealth Games medallists in wrestling
20th-century Nigerian people
Medallists at the 1982 Commonwealth Games